Glušica Nikšić is an intercity bus company based in Nikšić, Montenegro. With a fleet of coach buses, the company operates within the Nikšić municipality as well as to international destinations in Bosnia and Herzegovina and Serbia.

Incidents
On July 7, 2012, a group of five young men (two of which were 17 years old) were arrested for stealing a Glušica bus, during which time, they drove it out of the company's bus lot in Nikšić and struck a large rock before returning the bus to the location it was found at.

References

Bus companies of Montenegro
Coach transport in Montenegro